2015 Lebanese protests were a series of protests in response to the government's failure to find solutions to a waste crisis caused by the closure of the Beirut and Mount Lebanon region waste dump in Naameh (south of Beirut) in July 2015. The closure led the region's waste company Sukleen to suspend collection causing piles of rubbish to fill the streets. A series of small but increasing protests, led by grassroots organization "You Stink!," were held throughout the summer, culminating in large protests in August. These attracted thousands of demonstrators but also saw scuffles with police.

The protest were categorized by comical slogans and imaginative chants which mostly linked political figures to the crisis. However,  protesters were reported shouting a number of chants made popular during the Arab Spring uprisings across the region, including "Ash-shab yurid isqat an-nizam" (meaning "The people want to topple the regime").

The protests spawned the political campaign Beirut Madinati.

Issues
The ‘National Strategy’ for waste management, drawn up in the years after the Lebanese civil war, saw all the waste from the Beirut, Mount Lebanon region going to a single landfill site. The Naameh facility was opening in 1997 as a temporary, short term site that would take just two million tons of rubbish. 18 years later, the site had taken an estimated 15 million tons of waste.

Despite knowing of the closure, the Lebanese government had no plan in place for dealing with the waste. This led waste contractor to suspend collection in July causing waste to pile up around the city. On 27 August, Sukleen restarted collection but with no functioning dump sites, the waste was stored under bridges and on empty lots around the capital.

While the protests began over the piles of trash around Beirut and the Mount Lebanon region, they expanded to issues of civil representation, corruption and government inefficiency.

Protesters blamed Lebanese leaders, who according to them, did not have a long-term vision to solve the ecological issues affecting Lebanon. See Marine environmental issues in Lebanon.

Other issues include daily electricity blackouts, and political bickering that has kept Lebanon without a president since May 2014.

23 August 2015 demonstration 
Lebanese army units were deployed in central Beirut after the demonstration degenerated in street fighting between protesters and law enforcement. The Lebanese Red Cross said it treated 402 people in Sunday's protest. About 40 people were taken to hospital. Ambulances ferried out casualties after security forces fired tear gas, rubber bullets and water cannon at demonstrators protesting against what they call Lebanon's "political dysfunction". About 200 youths, some wearing scarves or masks to cover their faces, threw stones and bottles filled with sand at police and tried to pull down security barricades. Some demonstrators lit fires. A tree next to a church was set ablaze, road signs were pulled from the ground and shop fronts smashed.

The protest, organized by an online group "You Stink!" along with other civil society groups, attracted an estimated  people on the streets of Riad El Solh Square in central Beirut.

By 29 August, more than  Lebanese took to the streets to manifest against the government's corruption. It began as small protest, but it has soon proved to become an uprising, with many protesters calling for a revolution.

Reactions

International

Bahrain: The Ministry of Foreign Affairs renewed its call to Bahraini citizens not to travel to the Lebanese Republic to ensure their security and safety, in view of the unstable security situation in the country, calling at the same time on citizens in Lebanon to leave immediately.
Kuwait: On 23 August, the Kuwaiti Embassy called on its nationals to remain vigilant for their safety at all times. "Under the current critical circumstances, the Kuwaiti nationals in Lebanon are advised to cancel any unnecessary plans and leave," it said in a statement.

Organisations
Sigrid Kaag, The U.N. special coordinator for Lebanon, in a statement called for cabinet to resolve the crisis as quickly as possible.
Euro-Mediterranean Human Rights Monitor: issued a press release documenting the use of excessive force against peaceful protesters by Lebanese authorities in September 2015. The Euro-med called for quick solutions to end the problem by providing a good public-health services which the residents of Lebanon deserve.

See also
Cedar Revolution
2006–2008 Lebanese protests
2011 Lebanese protests
List of protests in the 21st century

References

2015 in Lebanon
2015 protests
2016 in Lebanon
2016 protests
Aftermath of the Arab Spring
Protests in Lebanon